Tommaso D'Orazio (born 3 May 1990) is an Italian football player. He plays for  club Cosenza on loan from Südtirol.

Club career
He is the product of youth teams of Pescara. The first five seasons of his senior career were spent in Serie D and Eccellenza (fourth and fifth tiers).

He made his Serie C debut for Ancona on 26 October 2014 in a game against San Marino as a starter.

On 11 January 2017, he joined Serie C club Cosenza on loan from Teramo. Cosenza signed him on a permanent basis at the end of the season, executing the option in the loan contract. For 2018–19 season, Cosenza was promoted to Serie B and D'Orazio re-signed with the club on a two-year contract.

On 17 September 2020 he signed a 2-year contract with Bari. On 21 January 2021, he was loaned to Serie B club Ascoli.

On 30 June 2021, he transferred to Ascoli on a permanent basis and signed a two-year contract.

On 28 June 2022, D'Orazio moved to newly-promoted Serie B club Südtirol on a two-year contract. 

On 25 January 2023, D'Orazio returned to Cosenza on loan with an obligation to buy.

References

External links
 

1990 births
Sportspeople from the Province of Chieti
Footballers from Abruzzo
Living people
Italian footballers
Association football defenders
Giulianova Calcio players
A.C. Ancona players
S.S. Teramo Calcio players
U.S. Pistoiese 1921 players
Cosenza Calcio players
S.S.C. Bari players
Ascoli Calcio 1898 F.C. players
F.C. Südtirol players
Serie B players
Serie C players
Serie D players